Uric acid is a heterocyclic compound of carbon, nitrogen, oxygen, and hydrogen with the formula C5H4N4O3. It forms ions and salts known as urates and acid urates, such as ammonium acid urate. Uric acid is a product of the metabolic breakdown of purine nucleotides, and it is a normal component of urine. High blood concentrations of uric acid can lead to gout and are associated with other medical conditions, including diabetes and the formation of ammonium acid urate kidney stones.

Chemistry
Uric acid was first isolated from kidney stones in 1776 by Swedish chemist Carl Wilhelm Scheele. In 1882, the Ukrainian chemist Ivan Horbaczewski first synthesized uric acid by melting urea with glycine.

Uric acid displays lactam–lactim tautomerism.). Uric acid crystallizes in the lactam form, with computational chemistry also indicating that tautomer to be the most stable.
Uric acid is a diprotic acid with pKa1 = 5.4 and pKa2 = 10.3. Thus at physiological pH, urate predominates in solution.

{| cellpadding="5" border="0" style="text-align:center; float: center; background: transparent; border: 1px solid darkgray;"
|+ Tautomers of uric acid and urate
|-
| ||  ||  || pKa1 || 
|-
| Lactam form || || Lactim form || || Urate ion
|}

Water solubility
In general, the water solubility of uric acid and its alkali metal and alkaline earth salts is rather low. All these salts exhibit greater solubility in hot water than cold, allowing for easy recrystallization. This low solubility is significant for the etiology of gout. The solubility of the acid and its salts in ethanol is very low or negligible. In ethanol/water mixtures, the solubilities are somewhere between the end values for pure ethanol and pure water.
{| class="wikitable sortable"
|+ Solubility of urate salts (grams of water per gram of compound)
! data-sort-type="text" | Compound
! data-sort-type="number" | Cold water
! data-sort-type="number" | Boiling water
|-
| Uric acid
| align=right | 15,000
| align=right | 2,000
|-
| Ammonium hydrogen urate
| align=center | —
| align=right | 1,600
|-
| Lithium hydrogen urate
| align=right | 370
| align=right | 39
|-
| Sodium hydrogen urate
| align=right | 1,175
| align=right | 124
|-
| Potassium hydrogen urate
| align=right | 790
| align=right | 75
|-
| Magnesium dihydrogen diurate
| align=right | 3,750
| align=right | 160
|-
| Calcium dihydrogen diurate
| align=right | 603
| align=right | 276
|-
| Disodium urate
| align=right | 77
| align=center | —
|-
| Dipotassium urate
| align=right | 44
| align=right | 35
|-
| Calcium urate
| align=right | 1,500
| align=right | 1,440
|-
| Strontium urate
| align=right | 4,300
| align=right | 1,790
|-
| Barium urate
| align=right | 7,900
| align=right | 2,700
|}

The figures given indicate what mass of water is required to dissolve a unit mass of compound indicated. The lower the number, the more soluble the substance in the said solvent.

Biochemistry
The enzyme xanthine oxidase (XO) catalyzes the formation of uric acid from xanthine and hypoxanthine. XO, which is found in mammals, functions primarily as a dehydrogenase and rarely as an oxidase, despite its name.) Xanthine in turn is produced from other purines. Xanthine oxidase is a large enzyme whose active site consists of the metal molybdenum bound to sulfur and oxygen.  Uric acid is released in hypoxic conditions (low oxygen saturation).

Genetic and physiological diversity

Primates 
In humans and other great apes, uric acid (actually hydrogen urate ion) is the final oxidation (breakdown) product of purine metabolism and is excreted in urine, whereas in most other mammals, the enzyme uricase further oxidizes uric acid to allantoin. The loss of uricase in higher primates parallels the similar loss of the ability to synthesize ascorbic acid, leading to the suggestion that urate may partially substitute for ascorbate in such species. Both uric acid and ascorbic acid are strong reducing agents (electron donors) and potent antioxidants. In humans, over half the antioxidant capacity of blood plasma comes from hydrogen urate ion.

Humans 
The normal concentration range of uric acid (or hydrogen urate ion) in human blood is 25 to 80 mg/L for men and 15 to 60 mg/L for women (but see below for slightly different values). An individual can have serum values as high as 96 mg/L and not have gout. In humans, about 70% of daily uric acid disposal occurs via the kidneys, and in 5–25% of humans, impaired renal (kidney) excretion leads to hyperuricemia. Normal excretion of uric acid in the urine is 270 to 360 mg per day (concentration of 270 to 360 mg/L if one litre of urine is produced per day – higher than the solubility of uric acid because it is in the form of dissolved acid urates), roughly 1% as much as the daily excretion of urea.

Dogs 
The Dalmatian has a genetic defect in uric acid uptake by the liver and kidneys, resulting in decreased conversion to allantoin, so this breed excretes uric acid, and not allantoin, in the urine.

Birds and reptiles 
In birds and reptiles, and in some desert-dwelling mammals (such as the kangaroo rat), uric acid also is the end product of purine metabolism, but it is excreted in feces as a dry mass. This involves a complex metabolic pathway that is energetically costly in comparison to processing of other nitrogenous wastes such as urea (from the urea cycle) or ammonia, but has the advantages of reducing water loss and preventing dehydration.

Invertebrates 
Platynereis dumerilii, a marine polychaete worm, uses uric acid as a sexual pheromone. The female of the species releases uric acid into the water during mating, to induce males to release sperm.

Genetics
Although foods such as meat and seafood can elevate serum urate levels, genetic variation is a much greater contributor to high serum urate. A proportion of people have mutations in the urate transport proteins responsible for the excretion of uric acid by the kidneys. Variants of a number of genes, linked to serum urate, have so far been identified: SLC2A9; ABCG2; SLC17A1; SLC22A11; SLC22A12; SLC16A9; GCKR; LRRC16A; and PDZK1. GLUT9, encoded by the SLC2A9 gene, is known to transport both uric acid and fructose.

Myogenic hyperuricemia, as a result of the Purine Nucleotide Cycle running when ATP reservoirs in muscle cells are low, is a common pathophysiologic feature of glycogenoses such as GSD-III, GSD-V and GSD-VII, as they are metabolic myopathies which impair the ability of ATP (energy) production for the muscle cells to use. In these metabolic myopathies, myogenic hyperuricemia is exercise-induced; inosine, hypoxanthine and uric acid increase in plasma after exercise and decrease over hours with rest. Excess AMP (adenosine monophosphate) is converted into uric acid.

AMP → IMP → Inosine → Hypoxanthine → Xanthine → Uric Acid

Clinical significance and research
In human blood plasma, the reference range of uric acid is typically 3.4–7.2 mg per 100 mL(200–430 μmol/L) for men, and 2.4–6.1 mg per 100 mL for women (140–360 μmol/L). Uric acid concentrations in blood plasma above and below the normal range are known as, respectively, hyperuricemia and hypouricemia. Likewise, uric acid concentrations in urine above and below normal are known as hyperuricosuria and hypouricosuria. Uric acid levels in saliva may be associated with blood uric acid levels.

High uric acid
Hyperuricemia (high levels of uric acid), which induces gout, has various potential origins:

 Diet may be a factor. High intake of dietary purine, high-fructose corn syrup, and sucrose can increase levels of uric acid.
 Serum uric acid can be elevated by reduced excretion via the kidneys.
 Fasting or rapid weight loss can temporarily elevate uric acid levels.
 Certain drugs, such as thiazide diuretics, can increase blood uric acid levels by interfering with renal clearance.
 Tumor lysis syndrome, a metabolic complication of certain cancers or chemotherapy, due to nucleobase and potassium release into the plasma.
 Low ATP (energy) reservoirs in muscle cells activating the myokinase reaction and the Purine Nucleotide Cycle to produce ATP and AMP. Low ATP reservoirs can be due to strenuous exercise, fasting or starvation, or impairment of ATP production such as metabolic myopathies, untreated diabetes, scurvy (Vitamin C deficiency), hypothyroidism, hyperthyroidism, hypoparathyroidism, hypopotassemia, and excessive alcohol consumption. Excess AMP (adenosine monophosphate) is converted into uric acid. AMP → IMP → Inosine → Hypoxanthine → Xanthine → Uric Acid

Gout

A 2011 survey in the United States indicated that 3.9% of the population had gout, whereas 21.4% had hyperuricemia without having symptoms.

Excess blood uric acid (serum urate) can induce gout, a painful condition resulting from needle-like crystals of uric acid termed monosodium urate crystals precipitating in joints, capillaries, skin, and other tissues. Gout can occur where serum uric acid levels are as low as 6 mg per 100 mL (357 μmol/L), but an individual can have serum values as high as 9.6 mg per 100 mL (565 μmol/L) and not have gout.

In humans, purines are metabolized into uric acid, which is then excreted in the urine. Consumption of large amounts of some types of purine-rich foods, particularly meat and seafood, increases gout risk. Purine-rich foods include liver, kidney, and sweetbreads, and certain types of seafood, including anchovies, herring, sardines, mussels, scallops, trout, haddock, mackerel, and tuna. Moderate intake of purine-rich vegetables, however, is not associated with an increased risk of gout.

One treatment for gout in the 19th century was administration of lithium salts; lithium urate is more soluble. Today, inflammation during attacks is more commonly treated with NSAIDs, colchicine, or corticosteroids, and urate levels are managed with allopurinol. Allopurinol, which weakly inhibits xanthine oxidase, is an analog of hypoxanthine that is hydroxylated by xanthine oxidoreductase at the 2-position to give oxipurinol.

Tumor lysis syndrome
Tumor lysis syndrome, an emergency condition that may result from blood cancers, produces high uric acid levels in blood when tumor cells release their contents into the blood, either spontaneously or following chemotherapy. Tumor lysis syndrome may lead to acute kidney injury when uric acid crystals are deposited in the kidneys. Treatment includes hyperhydration to dilute and excrete uric acid via urine, rasburicase to reduce levels of poorly soluble uric acid in blood, or allopurinol to inhibit purine catabolism from adding to uric acid levels.

Lesch–Nyhan syndrome
Lesch–Nyhan syndrome, a rare inherited disorder, is also associated with high serum uric acid levels. Spasticity, involuntary movement, and cognitive retardation as well as manifestations of gout are seen in this syndrome.

Cardiovascular disease
Hyperuricemia is associated with an increase in risk factors for cardiovascular disease. It is also possible that high levels of uric acid may have a causal role in the development of atherosclerotic cardiovascular disease, but this is controversial and the data are conflicting.

Uric acid stone formation
Kidney stones can form through deposits of sodium urate microcrystals.

Saturation levels of uric acid in blood may result in one form of kidney stones when the urate crystallizes in the kidney. These uric acid stones are radiolucent, so do not appear on an abdominal plain X-ray. Uric acid crystals can also promote the formation of calcium oxalate stones, acting as "seed crystals".

Type 2 diabetes
Hyperuricemia may be a consequence of insulin resistance in diabetes rather than its precursor. One study showed high serum uric acid was associated with higher risk of type 2 diabetes, independent of obesity, dyslipidemia, and hypertension. Hyperuricemia is associated with components of metabolic syndrome, including in children. Untreated diabetes causes muscle glycogen to become depleted as without insulin, the muscles cannot take in glucose to utilize it in glycolysis, nor can it take in glucose to store it as glycogen. The lack of ATP produced from glycogenolysis and glycolysis causes a low ATP reservoir in the muscle cell. When ATP reservoirs are low, ATP is produced via the myokinase reaction and the Purine Nucleotide Cycle. Excess AMP (adenosine monophosphate) is converted into uric acid.

AMP → IMP → Inosine → Hypoxanthine → Xanthine → Uric Acid

Metabolic Myopathies 

Metabolic myopathies, such as glycogenoses, impair the ability of the muscle cell to create ATP (energy). When ATP reservoirs are low, ATP is produced via the myokinase reaction and the Purine Nucleotide Cycle. In these metabolic myopathies, myogenic hyperuricemia is exercise-induced; inosine, hypoxanthine and uric acid increase in plasma after exercise and decrease over hours with rest. Excess AMP (adenosine monophosphate) is converted into uric acid. In GSD-VII (Tarui's disease, phosphofructokinase deficiency), besides a buildup of AMP from the myokinase reaction and the purine nucleotide cycle when the ATP reservoir is low (ADP>ATP), when the ATP reservoir returns to normal (ATP>ADP) then, there is also excessive production of IMP (inosine monophosphate) due to the glycolytic block necessitating that glucose be catabolized down the pentose phosphate pathway which produces Ribose 5-P, which then converts to PRPP, which is further converted to produce IMP by de novo synthesis, a process that requires ATP (see Purine Metabolism).

AMP → IMP → Inosine → Hypoxanthine → Xanthine → Uric Acid

Excessive Alcohol Consumption 
Hyperuricemia can be caused by excessive alcohol consumption by converting ethanol → acetaldehyde → acetate decreasing the amount of NAD+ available. NAD+ is needed for the Krebs Cycle to produce energy via oxidative phosphorylation. With impairment of the Krebs Cycle, this leads the ATP reservoir to become low, activating the myokinase reaction and the Purine Nucleotide Cycle. Excess AMP (adenosine monophosphate) is converted into uric acid.

AMP → IMP → Inosine → Hypoxanthine → Xanthine → Uric Acid

Scurvy (Vitamin C Deficiency) 
Vitamin C acts as a reducing agent, donating electrons in various enzymatic and non-enzymatic reactions. It is a cofactor for at least eight enzymatic reactions involved in key bodily processes including the production of collagen, preventing harmful genetic mutations, protecting white blood cells and the production of carnitine, vital for energy. Carnitine plays a crucial role in lipid metabolism. As scurvy reduces the production of carnitine, the ability of the body to utilize fats for energy is impaired, leading to a low ATP reservoir. When ATP reservoirs are low, ATP is produced via the myokinase reaction and the Purine Nucleotide Cycle. Excess AMP (adenosine monophosphate) is converted into uric acid.

AMP → IMP → Inosine → Hypoxanthine → Xanthine → Uric Acid

Abnormal thyroid function 
Both hypothyroidism and hyperthyroidism can cause a low ATP reservoir in the muscle cell as thyroxin affects mitochondrial oxidative capacity (the ability to produce ATP in the mitochondrion by oxidative phosphorylation). When ATP reservoirs are low, ATP is produced via the myokinase reaction and the Purine Nucleotide Cycle. Excess AMP (adenosine monophosphate) is converted into uric acid.

AMP → IMP → Inosine → Hypoxanthine → Xanthine → Uric Acid

Low uric acid
Low uric acid (hypouricemia) can have numerous causes. Low dietary zinc intakes cause lower uric acid levels. This effect can be even more pronounced in women taking oral contraceptive medication. Sevelamer, a drug indicated for prevention of hyperphosphataemia in people with chronic kidney failure, can significantly reduce serum uric acid.

Multiple sclerosis
Meta-analysis of 10 case-control studies found that the serum uric acid levels of patients with multiple sclerosis were significantly lower compared to those of healthy controls, possibly indicating a diagnostic biomarker for multiple sclerosis.

Normalizing low uric acid
Correcting low or deficient zinc levels can help elevate serum uric acid.

See also 
 Theacrine or 1,3,7,9-tetramethyluric acid, a purine alkaloid found in some teas
 Uracil – purine nucleobase named by Robert Behrend who was attempting to synthesize derivatives of uric acid
 Metabolic Myopathies
 Purine Nucleotide Cycle

References

External links

 Uric acid blood test – MedlinePlus

 
Nitrogen cycle
Organic acids
Triketones